The Paul Ehrlich and Ludwig Darmstaedter Prize is an annual award bestowed by the  since 1952 for investigations in medicine. It carries a prize money of 120,000 Euro. The prize awarding ceremony is traditionally held on March 14, the birthday of Nobel laureate Paul Ehrlich, in the St. Paul's Church, Frankfurt am Main.

Researchers from worldwide are awarded in the following fields of medicine: Immunology, Cancer research, Haematology, Microbiology and experimental and clinical Chemotherapy.

It is one of the highest endowed and internationally most distinguished awards in medicine in Germany.

Some of the prize winners were later awarded the Nobel Prize.

List of winners 

 1952
 , Tübingen
 , Nonnenhorn
 1953
 Adolf Butenandt, Munich
 1954
 Ernst Boris Chain, London
 1956
 Gerhard Domagk, Elberfeld
 1958
 Richard Johann Kuhn, Heidelberg
 1960
 Felix Haurowitz, Bloomington
 1961
 Albert Hewett Coons, Boston
 , Langen
 Örjan Ouchterlony, Gothenburg
 , Paris
 1962
 Otto Heinrich Warburg, Berlin
 1963
 Helmut Holzer, Freiburg im Breisgau
 , Cologne
 , Berlin
 , Rome
 1964
 , Copenhagen
 1965
 , Freiburg im Breisgau
 , Paris
 Ida Ørskov, Copenhagen
 , Copenhagen
 Bruce Stocker, Stanford
 1966
 Francis Peyton Rous, New York
 1967
 , Villejuif
 Renato Dulbecco, San Diego
 1968
 Walter Thomas James Morgan, London
 , Montreux
 1969
 , Boston
 Anne-Marie Staub, Paris
 Winifred M. Watkins, London
 1970
 Ernst Ruska, Berlin
 Helmut Ruska, Düsseldorf
 1971
 Albert Claude, Brussels
 Keith R. Porter, Boulder
 Fritiof S. Sjöstrand, Los Angeles
 1972
 Denis Parsons Burkitt, London / Uganda
 Jan Waldenström, Malmö
 1973
 Michael Anthony Epstein, Bristol
 Kimishige Ishizaka, Baltimore
 Dennis H. Wright, Southampton
 1974
 James L. Gowans, Oxford
 Jacques Miller, Melbourne
 1975
 George Bellamy Mackaness, Saranac Lake
 Avrion Mitchison, London
 , Copenhagen
 1976
 , Villejuif
 Boris Ephrussi, Gif-sur-Yvette
 1977
 Torbjörn Caspersson, Stockholm
 John B. Gurdon, Cambridge
 1978
 Ludwik Gross, New York
 , Tübingen
 1979
 Arnold Graffi, Berlin
 , Amsterdam
 Wallace P. Rowe, Bethesda
 1980
 , Saitama
 Hamao Umezawa, Tokyo
 1981
 Stanley Falkow, Seattle
 , Maebashi
 1982
 Niels Kaj Jerne, Castillon-du-Gard
 1983
 Peter C. Doherty, Canberra
 Michael Potter, Bethesda
 Rolf Zinkernagel, Zürich
 1984
 Piet Borst, Amsterdam
 George A. M. Cross, New York
 1985
 , Baltimore
 , Bethesda
 Ruth Sonntag Nussenzweig, New York University
 1986
 Abner L. Notkins, Bethesda
 1987
Jean-François Borel, Basel
 Hugh O'Neill McDevitt, Stanford
 Felix Milgrom, Buffalo
 1988
 Peter K. Vogt, Los Angeles
 1989
 Stuart A. Aaronson, Bethesda
Russell F. Doolittle, University of California, San Diego
 Thomas Graf, Heidelberg
 1990
 R. John Collier, Boston
 Alwin Max Pappenheimer, Jr., Cambridge, Massachusetts
 1991
 Rino Rappuoli, Siena
 , Tokyo
 1992
 Manfred Eigen, Göttingen
 1993
 Philippa Marrack, Denver
 John W. Kappler, Denver
 Harald von Boehmer, Basel
 1994
 Peter M. Howley, Boston
 Harald zur Hausen, Heidelberg
 1995
 Stanley Prusiner, San Francisco
 1996
 Pamela J. Bjorkman, Pasadena
 Hans-Georg Rammensee, Heidelberg
 Jack L. Strominger, Cambridge, Massachusetts
 1997
 Barry Marshall, Perth, Western Australia
 John Robin Warren, Perth, Western Australia
 1998
 David P. Lane, Dundee
 Arnold J. Levine, Princeton University
 Bert Vogelstein, Baltimore
 1999
 Robert Charles Gallo, Baltimore
 2000
 H. Robert Horvitz, Cambridge, Massachusetts
 John F. R. Kerr, Brisbane
 2001
 Stephen C. Harrison, Cambridge, Massachusetts
 Michael G. Rossmann, West Lafayette
 2002
 Craig Venter, Rockville
 2003
 Richard A. Lerner, La Jolla
 Peter G. Schultz, La Jolla
2004
 Tak Wah Mak, University of Toronto
 Mark M. Davis, Stanford University
 2005
 Ian Wilmut, Roslin Institute, Edinburgh
 2006 
 Craig Mello, Howard Hughes Medical Institute and Massachusetts Medical School in Worcester, Massachusetts
 Andrew Z. Fire, Stanford University
 2007
 Ada Yonath, Biochemist, Weizmann Institute, Rehovot, Israel
 Harry Noller, University of California, Santa Cruz, USA
2008
 , University of Rochester
 2009
 Elizabeth Blackburn, University of California, San Francisco
 Carol W. Greider, Johns Hopkins University, Baltimore
 2010 
 Charles Dinarello, University of Colorado Denver
2011
 Cesare Montecucco, University of Padua
 2012 
 Peter Walter, University of California, San Francisco
2013
 Mary-Claire King, University of Washington, Seattle
2014
 , University of Freiburg
2015
 James P. Allison, University of Texas, Houston
 Carl H. June, Perelman School of Medicine at the University of Pennsylvania
2016 
 Emmanuelle Charpentier, Max Planck Institute for Infection Biology, Berlin, and Umeå University
 Jennifer Doudna, University of California, Berkeley
2017
 Yuan Chang, University of Pittsburgh Cancer Institute
 Patrick S. Moore, University of Pittsburgh Cancer Institute
2018
 Anthony Cerami, Araim Pharmaceuticals, Tarrytown, New York State
 David Wallach, The Weizmann Institute of Science in Rehovot
2019
 Franz-Ulrich Hartl, Max Planck Institute, Munich
 Arthur L. Horwich, Yale School of Medicine
2020
 Shimon Sakaguchi, Osaka University, Japan
2021
 Michael R. Silverman, Emeritus Agouron Institute in La Jolla
 Bonnie Bassler, Princeton University and Howard Hughes Medical Institute
2022
 Katalin Karikó, University of Pennsylvania
 Özlem Türeci, BioNTech in Mainz (Germany) and 
 Uğur Şahin, BioNTech in Mainz (Germany)
2023
 Frederick W. Alt, Harvard Medical School
 David G. Schatz, Yale Medical School

See also
 Ludwig Darmstaedter
 List of medicine awards

References

External links 

 

German awards
Medicine awards
Awards established in 1952
Paul Ehrlich